Reza Samani (born 1977) is an Iranian musician.

Biography
Samani was born in Chahar Mahal, Bakhtiari, Iran.

Samani immigrated to Germany in 1999.

He has been a member of the Ensemble Samani since 1999 and Ensemble Zarbang since 2001.

Discography
Call to Love. Hermes Records, 2008.
Naghme-ye khabgard. Kârgâh-e Musiqi, 2006.
Persian and Middle Eastern Percussion.  ARC-Music,  2005
Rengineh. 2003.
Daf Duo: Samani. 2001.

References

1977 births
Living people
21st-century Iranian musicians
Date of birth missing (living people)